Vladimir Lert is a USA & Ukraine-based filmmaker, screenwriter, art director and producer.

Biography 
Lert studied direction and acting simultaneously, the former at Brooks Institute in Santa Barbara, California and the latter at the International Actors’ School in Los Angeles founded by Alexander Kuznetsov. After completing his studies in 2006, he traveled to Kiev, Ukraine, where he filmed a number of small budget films and participated in the Kiev Film Festival.

Lert began his career in Hollywood as an assistant producer, while also working as an alternate actor in several films. He shot the film "Rejection", released in 2011.

In 2016, he wrote the screenplay for and directed St. Valentine's Night. The script underwent significant improvisation all through the filming.

Lert's third feature,  Tevye's Daughters was released in 2017. The film is based on Sholem Aleichem's Tevye's Daughters, most noted for being adapted into the musical The Fiddler on the Roof. Lert shot the film partially at the Pyrohiv Outdoor Museum in Ukraine, to recreate early Ukrainian country life and folklore. He based the screenplay on Memorial Prayer, a play by Grigori Gorin. The plot centres around Tevye the Dairyman's attempts to secure marriages for his seven daughters. The movie was screened at the Rhode Island International Film Festival. Won Best feature film - first prise.

In 2018, "Tevye's Daughters" was nominated for a Golden Globe in the foreign language film category.

Filmography

As director 
 2009 – Rejection
 2013 – Captive
 2016 – St. Valentine's night
 2017 – Tevye's Daughters

As writer 
 2009 – Rejection
 2013 – Captive
 2017 – Tevye's Daughters

References

External links

1979 births
Living people
Latvian film directors
Latvian screenwriters